Wallace Estill Sr. House, also known as the Old Stone House, is a historic home located near Union, Monroe County, West Virginia.  It was built in 1773, is of stone and frame construction. The stone part measures 20 feet, 6 inches, by 25 feet, 6 inches. The house has two stone chimneys from which three fireplaces and two flues for woodstoves are provided.  It is a good example of pioneer architecture.  The house is the ancestral home of United States Senator Chuck Robb as his grandmother, Susan Gay Estill, was the great-granddaughter of its owner Isaac Estill.

Wallace Estill's son, Captain James Estill, was a Kentucky militia officer during the Revolutionary War, after whom Estill County, Kentucky was named. Captain Estill was killed at the Battle of Little Mountain, also known as Estill's Defeat, during the Revolutionary War.

It was listed on the National Register of Historic Places in 1984.

References

Colonial architecture in West Virginia
Houses completed in 1773
Houses in Monroe County, West Virginia
Houses on the National Register of Historic Places in West Virginia
Stone houses in West Virginia
National Register of Historic Places in Monroe County, West Virginia